The 2003 Australian Grand Prix (formally the 2003 Foster's Australian Grand Prix) was a Formula One motor race held on 9 March 2003 at the Melbourne Grand Prix Circuit. The race was won by McLaren driver David Coulthard, who took the 13th and final race victory of his Formula One career.

Report

Background
There was a lot of speculation about how the new set of rules that debuted in this race would affect Ferrari, which were the ones to cause the changes after their dominant 2002 season.

Qualifying
Qualifying was an all Ferrari affair, with Schumacher edging out Barrichello. Montoya took third, with Frentzen, Panis and Villeneuve putting in good performances for 4th, 5th and 6th. The McLarens had poor qualifying, with Coulthard in 11th, and Räikkönen making a mistake, and ending up 15th.

Race
Weather conditions were changeable at the start. Räikkönen stopped for dry tyres at the end of the formation lap. Barrichello jumped the start, and received a drive-through penalty. Schumacher led at the end of lap 1, with Barrichello in close company. Montoya was 6 seconds behind in third, followed by Frentzen and Villeneuve. Panis struggled on dry tyres, with the Renaults, Ralf Schumacher and Coulthard climbing quickly. Barrichello took his penalty, and on his in-lap, lost traction on a quickly drying track, crashing at Turn Five on lap five, followed by rookie Ralph Firman, who had climbed to eighth by lap seven on his dry Bridgestones. Da Matta’s debut also came to a premature end when he spun into the gravel at turn 3. Schumacher dropped to eighth, pitting for dry tyres, with the leaders pitting just before a safety car to clear the stranded cars. Mark Webber's Jaguar had climbed to sixth, but his rear suspension broke just after the restart and he stopped in an awkward place, prompting a second appearance of the safety car.

At the halfway point of the race, Montoya was leading, followed by Kimi Räikkönen and Michael Schumacher. Renault's Jarno Trulli also fought closely until he went into the pits. Räikkönen had his turn leading the race until he received a drive-through penalty for speeding in the pit lane. After a wheel-to-wheel dispute with the Finnish driver, Michael Schumacher was forced onto the grass, consequently losing his right deflector, which despite not having great overall impact on the car's aerodynamics, prevented him from closing on Räikkönen again. He missed out on the podium for the first time since the 2001 Italian Grand Prix and ending Ferrari's 53 consecutive podium finishes. It was the first time since the 1999 European Grand Prix that neither of the Ferraris finished on the podium. When Williams seemed to have the first victory of the year in their pocket, Montoya spun after entering the first corner too fast, with eight laps from the end and without any pressure from his rivals. Montoya returned to the track, but lost first place to Coulthard, who won what turned out to be his last race victory. Montoya was visibly frustrated on the podium.

Classification

Qualifying

Race

Championship standings after the race 

Drivers' Championship standings

Constructors' Championship standings

Note: Only the top five positions are included for both sets of standings.

References

External links

Grand Prix
Australian Grand Prix
Australian Grand Prix
Australian Grand Prix